1000 Hands: Chapter One is the fifteenth studio album by English singer-songwriter and musician Jon Anderson, originally released in March 2019.

Origins
The album originates from sessions for a project to have been called Uzlot (a northern English pronunciation of "us lot") that Anderson had been recording in Big Bear, California, with Brian Chatton in around 1990. Chatton wrote most of the music, played keyboards and also sang. Anderson asked his then Yes bandmates Chris Squire and Alan White to play on the project too. At the time, Yes were preparing for a tour and Anderson put the master tapes in his garage and, as he has recounted, gave them very little thought for many years. In 2016, producer Michael Franklin contacted Anderson about using the tapes and finishing the album. Further recordings followed at Solar Studios in Orlando, Florida. Along with some newly written material, the final result is 1000 Hands.

As the album title suggests, the album was created with a number of guest performers, including Steve Howe, Jethro Tull's Ian Anderson, Brian Chatton, Larry Coryell, Steve Morse, Journey keyboardist Jonathan Cain, Vanilla Fudge drummer Carmine Appice, Rick Derringer, the Tower of Power horn section, violinist Jean-Luc Ponty and pianist Chick Corea.

Release
In October 2018, a dedicated album website launched containing the artwork and audio samples. The album was released on 31 March 2019 under multiple formats: digital download, CD, and limited edition vinyl. Anderson also released the following statement.

"I've spent long periods of time making some records, but I've never taken a journey quite like this one. To say that 1,000 Hands has been a long time in coming would be quite an understatement, but I'm thrilled that it's finally a reality and that my fans will now be able to hear it. And I think they'll be delighted to hear music that's timeless. It's one of the best things I've ever done".

Re-release
On 29 May 2020, Jon Anderson revealed that the 1000 Hands album would be released again in Summer 2020. Indeed, Anderson signed a new deal with Blue Élan Records. The album would be launched on 31 July 2020 on CD, deluxe 180-gram double vinyl and on digital and streaming platforms.

Promotion
Anderson promoted the album with a US tour from March to August 2019.

Track listing

"WDMCF" stands for "Where Does Music Come From".

Personnel
Music
Jon Anderson – various instruments, vocals

Additional musicians

Steve Howe – guitar
Larry Coryell – guitar
Rick Derringer – guitar
Chris Squire – bass guitar
Tim Franklin – bass guitar, ukulele, backing vocals
Stuart Hamm – bass guitar
Brian Chatton – keyboards, backing vocals
Chick Corea – keyboards
Jonathan Cain – keyboards
Michael Franklin – keyboards, ukulele, backing vocals
Alan White – drums
Billy Cobham – drums
Matt Brown – drums, backing vocals
Jerry Goodman – violin
Jean-Luc Ponty – violin
Robby Steinhardt – violin
Charlie Bisharat – violin
Olga Kopakova – violin
Dariusz Grabowski – accordion
Brian Snapp – saxophone, flute
Charlie DeChant – saxophone, flute
Ian Anderson – flute
Tower of Power – horn section
Zap Mama – backing vocals
Bobby Kimball – backing vocals
Solar Choir – choir
Voices of Lindahl – choir
Crossover
Vioelectric 
Orlando Symphony Orchestra – strings and horns

Production
Michael Franklin – producer
Matt Brown – mixing
Bernie Grundman – mastering

Charts

References

2019 albums
Jon Anderson albums